Isonychia velma is a species of brushlegged mayfly in the family Isonychiidae. It is found in North America.

References

Mayflies
Articles created by Qbugbot
Insects described in 1932